Johan Etienne Anthony Cavalli (born 12 September 1981) is a French former professional footballer who played as a midfielder.

Club career

Early career
Whilst at Lorient Cavalli played as a substitute in the 2002 Coupe de France Final in which they beat SC Bastia.

Watford
Cavalli joined Watford on deadline day of the 2007 January transfer window, on a free transfer from French side Istres, signing an 18-month contract. He made his debut in the 1–0 win against West Ham United on 10 February 2007. He had his contract with "Hornets" cancelled by mutual consent on 20 August 2007.

Mons
On 18 October 2007, it was announced that Cavalli had signed a two-year contract with Belgian club Mons. In May 2008, he left the club my mutual consent.

Ajaccio
Cavalli joined his hometown club AC Ajaccio in November 2010 on a contract running until 2013.

He started on the opening day of the 2011–12 Ligue 1 season, playing 77 minutes in a 2–0 loss to Toulouse. He was also in the starting eleven for Ajaccio's trip to the Stade Gerland the following weekend and played 78 minutes in a 1–1 draw with hosts Lyon. In Ajaccio 1–1 draw against fellow Ligue 1 newcomers Evian on 20 August 2011 he set up midfield partner Frédéric Sammaritano for the 7th-minute 1–0 lead following a "great combination" between him and Benjamin André.

Following a five-match suspension, Cavalli returned on 10 April 2015 to face Dijon. He scored via penalty as Ajaccio beat Dijon 1–0 at the Stade François Coty.

At the end of the 2019–20 season, after ten years with Ajaccio, Cavalli retired from playing.

International career
Cavalli has been capped for the Corsica national football team, which is not a FIFA member, as it does not represent a fully sovereign nation. On 31 May 2011, he scored the only goal to help his team to a prestigious 1–0 win over Bulgaria in a friendly match.

References

External links
 
 
 

1981 births
Living people
Sportspeople from Ajaccio
French footballers
Footballers from Corsica
Corsica international footballers
Association football midfielders
FC Lorient players
US Créteil-Lusitanos players
RCD Mallorca players
FC Istres players
Watford F.C. players
R.A.E.C. Mons players
Nîmes Olympique players
AC Ajaccio players
Ligue 1 players
Ligue 2 players
Premier League players
Belgian Pro League players
French expatriate footballers
Expatriate footballers in Belgium
Expatriate footballers in England
Expatriate footballers in Spain
French expatriate sportspeople in Belgium
French expatriate sportspeople in England
French expatriate sportspeople in Spain